Mount Hofmann is a snow-covered mountain,  high, between the mouths of Hamilton Glacier and Heilman Glacier in the northern part of the Queen Elizabeth Range, Antarctica. It was mapped by the United States Geological Survey from tellurometer surveys and Navy air photos, 1960–62, and was named by the Advisory Committee on Antarctic Names for Walther F. Hofmann, a United States Antarctic Research Program glaciologist on the Ross Ice Shelf, 1962–63.

References

Mountains of the Ross Dependency
Shackleton Coast